HMS Montserrat (K586) was a  of the United Kingdom that served during World War II. She originally was ordered by the United States Navy as the Tacoma-class patrol frigate USS Hornby (PF-82) and was transferred to the Royal Navy prior to completion.

Construction and acquisition
The ship, originally designated a "patrol gunboat," PG-190, was ordered by the United States Maritime Commission under a United States Navy contract as USS Hornby. She was reclassified as a "patrol frigate," PF-82, on 15 April 1943 and laid down by the Walsh-Kaiser Company at Providence, Rhode Island, on 28 August 1943.  Intended for transfer to the United Kingdom, the ship was renamed Montserrat by the British prior to launching and was launched on 27 September 1943.

Service history
Transferred to the United Kingdom under Lend-Lease on 31 August 1944, the ship served in the Royal Navy as HMS Montserrat (K586) on patrol and escort duty.

Disposal
The United Kingdom returned Montserrat to the U.S. Navy on 11 June 1946. She was sold to the John J. Duane Company of Quincy, Massachusetts, on 30 November 1947 for scrapping.

References

Notes

Bibliography
 
 Navsource Online: Frigate Photo Archive HMS Montserrat (K 586) ex-Hornby ex-PF-82 ex-PG-190

External links
 Photo gallery of HMS Montserrat (K586)

1943 ships
Ships built in Providence, Rhode Island
Tacoma-class frigates
Colony-class frigates
World War II frigates and destroyer escorts of the United States
World War II frigates of the United Kingdom